In the 1976 United States presidential election, Florida was won by the Democratic candidate, former Governor of Georgia Jimmy Carter, over the Republican candidate, incumbent President Gerald Ford. Carter won by a margin of 5.29%, giving him 17 electoral votes. This result made Florida slightly over 4% more Democratic than the nation-at-large-- the last time Florida voted more Democratic than the nation in a presidential election. Carter did well in the South, with Arkansas and his home state of Georgia giving him particularly large margins. Florida, together with other growing Southern states such as Virginia (which he narrowly lost) and Texas, however, were more competitive, as Ford did well in many growing counties in the South, in many cases largely inhabited by transplants. In Florida, Ford did well in coastal southwestern Florida, most of which had turned Republican as early as the late 1940s and had stuck with Goldwater in 1964. He also carried the large, then-typically Republican counties of Orange, Palm Beach, and Pinellas, although by narrow margins in the latter two cases. Carter carried the home counties of Miami (Dade), Tampa (Hillsborough), and Jacksonville (Duval) by healthy margins, and dominated rural Florida. He also became the first Democrat to win Broward County since 1944.

One region which Carter was unable to reclaim for the Democrats was the far western part of the Panhandle; he became the second Democrat (after Johnson in 1964) to win the White House without Okaloosa County since its founding in 1915; the second (after Johnson) since 1856 to win without Santa Rosa County; and the second ever (after Johnson) to win without Escambia County.

A bellwether state until late 2010s, Florida has voted for the winner in every election since 1928, except for three elections (1960, 1992, and 2020). , this is the last election in which Polk County, Brevard County, Marion County, Bay County, Holmes County, Washington County, DeSoto County, Hardee County, Nassau County, St. Johns County, and Walton County voted for a Democratic presidential candidate. This was also the last election in which Duval County voted for the Democratic candidate until Joe Biden won it in 2020.

As of 2020, this is the most recent time that Florida voted more Democratic than the following states in a presidential election: California, Connecticut, Hawaii, Illinois, Maine, Michigan, New Jersey, New York, Oregon, Pennsylvania, Vermont, Washington, and Wisconsin.

Results

Results by county

References

Flor
1976
1976 Florida elections